Weiguo is the Mandarin Pinyin spelling of three Chinese masculine given names (see table). These names are also spelled Wei-kuo in Mandarin Wade-Giles (used in Taiwan), Wai-kwok in typical Hong Kong Cantonese spelling, or Wee-kok in Minnan pronunciation.

Meaning
These names are popular patriotic names (the second character means "country" or "nation"). In the year of Singapore's independence, many proud parents named their children Weiguo, resulting in confusion for them later in life because so many shared the same name. The name "latitude of the nation" (緯國),  paired with a brother named "longitude of the nation" (經國), is an allusion to the classical Chinese phrase jīngbāng wěiguó (經邦緯國), literally meaning "(to draw) the longitude and latitude of the nation", and metaphorically meaning a person who rules over a nation. Chiang Kai-shek's chosen names for his sons Chiang Wei-kuo and Chiang Ching-kuo are an example of this allusion.

People
People with these names include:

Politics and government
Chiang Wei-kuo (蔣緯國, 1916–1997), Republic of China general and politician
Nie Weiguo (聂卫国, born 1952), Chinese politician
Lo Wai-kwok (盧偉國, born 1953), Hong Kong politician
Yu Weiguo (于伟国, born 1955), Chinese politician in Fujian
Han Weiguo (韩卫国, born 1956), People's Liberation Army lieutenant general
Gong Weiguo (龚卫国, born 1972), Chinese politician

Sport
Peng Weiguo (彭伟国, born 1971), Chinese footballer
Tam Wai-kwok (譚偉國, born 1977), Hong Kong footballer

Other
Lawrence Ng Wai-kwok (伍衛國, born 1954), Hong Kong television actor
Lin Weiguo (林卫国, born 1970), Chinese chess player
Weiguo Sun (孙卫国), president of Xihua University in Chengdu, Sichuan, China since 2009

See also
Chinese given name

References

Chinese masculine given names